Thyrassia procumbens is a species of moth in the family Zygaenidae. It is found on Java and Sumatra.

The wingspan is 14–23 mm.

The larvae feed on Cayratia trifolia.

References

Moths described in 1895
Procridinae